John Willard "Will" Clawson (January 18, 1858 – April 6, 1936) was an American, Utah-based artist, in the late-19th and early 20th-century.

Biography
Clawson was born to Hiram B. Clawson and his wife, the former Alice Young.  Alice was a daughter of Brigham Young, and Clawson was born in the blue room of the Beehive House, which was built by Brigham Young for his wives and their families.

Clawson studied at the University of Deseret, among his notable teachers there was George M. Ottinger.   He married Mary Clark in the LDS Church Endowment House shortly before his departure for New York City to study at the National Academy of Design.   He then returned to Salt Lake City where he was primarily involved in portrait painting although he preferred doing landscapes.  In 1891 Clawson went to Paris where he studied at the Académie Julian and then the École des Beaux-Arts.   While at the later institution he received instruction from Claude Monet and Édouard Manet.   He also spent nine months in Vienne studying under Julius Stewart.  Before returning to the United States he also traveled to Britain where he did portraits of several members of parliament.

He returned to Utah in 1896 where he established a studio and served as the first secretary of the Society of Utah Artists.   However he later moved to San Francisco.  His studio and $80,000 worth of art were destroyed in the 1906 earthquake, after which he relocated his practice to Los Angeles.   From 1909 to 1919 Clawson practiced art in New York City and then in the later year he returned to Los Angeles.  In Los Angeles Clawson mainly painted portraits of movie and theatre stars, the later often coming from New York City.

In 1933 Clawson retired to Utah.   He was able to then focus on landscape painting, and portraits of Latter-day Saint leaders, including a portrait of Joseph Smith, Jr. he worked on the day of his death.

Collections
The Art Department of Brigham Young University holds a large collection of his works, totalling 155. The Utah Museum of Fine Arts also holds some of his works.

Publications

References

Bibliography

Online
Clawson, John Willard (1858-1936), Springville Museum of Art
John W. Clawson, Utah Artists Collection, J. Willard Marriott Library, University of Utah
Bio of Clawson at askart.com

Further reading

External links

1858 births
1936 deaths
19th-century American painters
American male painters
20th-century American painters
Académie Julian alumni
American Latter Day Saint artists
Painters from Utah
National Academy of Design alumni
University of Utah alumni
Latter Day Saints from Utah
American expatriates in France
Latter Day Saints from New York (state)
Latter Day Saints from California
19th-century American male artists
20th-century American male artists